Asfij or Esfij or Asfyj may refer to:
 Asfich, in South Khorasan
 Asfij, South Khorasan
 Asfyj, Yazd
 Asfyj District, in Yazd Province
 Asfyj Rural District, in Yazd Province